George Lennox may refer to:

 Lord George Lennox (1737–1805), British Army officer and politician
 George Lennox (footballer), Irish footballer